Manawaru or Manawarū is a rural community in the Matamata-Piako District and Waikato region of New Zealand's North Island.

It is located south-east of Te Aroha and north-east of Ngarua, and includes part of the Waihou River and some of the foothills of the Kaimai Ranges.

It features a bible chapel, a school, a Playcentre for early childhood education, and a community hall that can accommodate up to 200 people.

Demographics
The SA1 area is part of the larger Waihou-Manawaru statistical area.

The SA1 area had a population of 114 at the 2018 New Zealand census, an increase of 6 people (5.6%) since the 2013 census, and a decrease of 3 people (−2.6%) since the 2006 census. There were 42 households, comprising 54 males and 57 females, giving a sex ratio of 0.95 males per female. The median age was 37.3 years (compared with 37.4 years nationally), with 24 people (21.1%) aged under 15 years, 24 (21.1%) aged 15 to 29, 54 (47.4%) aged 30 to 64, and 9 (7.9%) aged 65 or older.

Ethnicities were 94.7% European/Pākehā, 15.8% Māori, and 5.3% other ethnicities. People may identify with more than one ethnicity.

Although some people chose not to answer the census's question about religious affiliation, 60.5% had no religion, 28.9% were Christian and 2.6% had other religions.

Of those at least 15 years old, 18 (20.0%) people had a bachelor's or higher degree, and 21 (23.3%) people had no formal qualifications. The median income was $35,400, compared with $31,800 nationally. 18 people (20.0%) earned over $70,000 compared to 17.2% nationally. The employment status of those at least 15 was that 57 (63.3%) people were employed full-time, 15 (16.7%) were part-time, and 6 (6.7%) were unemployed.

Waihou-Manawaru statistical area

Waihou-Manawaru had a population of 1,209 at the 2018 New Zealand census, an increase of 78 people (6.9%) since the 2013 census, and an increase of 39 people (3.3%) since the 2006 census. There were 429 households, comprising 627 males and 582 females, giving a sex ratio of 1.08 males per female. The median age was 39.9 years (compared with 37.4 years nationally), with 264 people (21.8%) aged under 15 years, 201 (16.6%) aged 15 to 29, 552 (45.7%) aged 30 to 64, and 186 (15.4%) aged 65 or older.

Ethnicities were 86.4% European/Pākehā, 12.7% Māori, 3.0% Pacific peoples, 6.5% Asian, and 3.5% other ethnicities. People may identify with more than one ethnicity.

The percentage of people born overseas was 14.6, compared with 27.1% nationally.

Although some people chose not to answer the census's question about religious affiliation, 56.3% had no religion, 29.8% were Christian, 0.2% had Māori religious beliefs, 0.5% were Hindu, 0.5% were Buddhist and 4.0% had other religions.

Of those at least 15 years old, 87 (9.2%) people had a bachelor's or higher degree, and 285 (30.2%) people had no formal qualifications. The median income was $33,800, compared with $31,800 nationally. 147 people (15.6%) earned over $70,000 compared to 17.2% nationally. The employment status of those at least 15 was that 480 (50.8%) people were employed full-time, 168 (17.8%) were part-time, and 33 (3.5%) were unemployed.

History

In 1897, the New Zealand Dairy Association established Te Aroha creamery under the leadership of former Cornish bricklayer Samuel Whitburn. Two years later, Whitburn relocated the operation to Manawaru.

The Manawaru Creamery was able to process up to 500 gallons per hour. By the 1900 dairy season it had fifteen suppliers and was processing the milk of about 400 cows. Cream was sent every day to Te Aroha railway station, where it was transported to Ngāruawāhia.

In 1902, Manawaru was an established farming community receiving bi-weekly mail. One of the settlers at this time, Henry Osborne, was born in Geelong and had lived in various places in Victoria, New South Wales and Waikato before he started farming in Manawaru in 1900.

There is a Roll of Honour at the Manawarū Hall to commemorate the 54 local men who served overseas during the Second World War. It also includes a wooden tablet inset with the photographs of the four local men who died in action.

Education

The school was established in 1900 and celebrated its 75th jubilee in 1975.

School gates

Memorial gates were erected at the school in 2000.

The left pillar bears a plaque for locals who served in overseas wars:

The right pillar has a plaque, dedicated to the first European settlers to the area:

References

Matamata-Piako District
Populated places in Waikato